One Sided Story is the second album by Canadian power pop band The Pursuit of Happiness, released in 1990. It was recorded over a two-and-a-half week span in November 1989. 

After having been on the road nearly non-stop following Love Junk's success, band leader Moe Berg wrote all of the material for One Sided Story in just four months, completing the last songs just hours before the band started recording for the album.

Just after finishing recording the album, original bass player Johnny Sinclair and backup singer Leslie Stanwyck left the band in order to pursue their own project (which would eventually become Universal Honey). After approximately three weeks of auditions, Sinclair and Stanwyck were replaced by Brad Barker on bass and Susan Murumets on backing vocals. Muruments stuck around only for the tour to support the album, leaving to concentrate on her own musical career, whereas Barker has remained with the band ever since.

Commercial performance
One Sided Story peaked at #18 on the RPM Canadian Albums Chart. The album was the 12th best selling Cancon album in Canada of 1990. The album was certified Gold in Canada.

Track listing
All songs written by Moe Berg

"Food" (2:31)
"Two Girls in One" (2:35)
"New Language" (2:42)
"Something Physical" (3:06)
"One Thing" (2:58)
"No Safe Place" (3:10)
"Shave Your Legs" (2:49)
"Runs in the Family" (3:04)
"All I Want" (4:48)
"Forbidden Fruit" (3:16)
"Little Platoons (My Neighbourhood)" (2:51)
"Survival" (5:05)

Personnel
 Moe Berg – guitar, vocals
 Kris Abbott – vocals, guitar
 Dave Gilby – drums
 Johnny Sinclair – bass
 Leslie Stanwyck – vocals, acoustic guitar
 Gary Windo – saxophone (12)

References

1990 albums
The Pursuit of Happiness (band) albums
Albums produced by Todd Rundgren
Chrysalis Records albums